The list of closed railway stations in Britain includes the following: Year of closure is given if known. Stations reopened as heritage railways continue to be included in this list and some have been linked. Some stations have been reopened to passenger traffic. Some lines remain in use for freight and mineral traffic.

K

Ke

Ki

Kn

L

La

Le

Lh

Li

Ll

Lo

Lu

Ly

See also
 List of closed railway stations in London

Notes

References
 
 
 

Disused railway stations in Great Britain
Lists of railway stations in Great Britain